Army Welfare Housing Organisation is a society formed in December 1978 under the Indian Societies Registration Act XXI of 1860. The aim and objective of the Organisation is to construct houses for serving/retired Army personnel and their widows in selected 
stations throughout the country. Adjutant-General of the Indian Army is the  ex-officio chairman of AWHO and the board of governors is entirely constituted of senior army officers. The Organisation claims to function on 'No Profit No Loss' basis but that has been disputed. Serving/Veteran allottees of some projects have dragged the organization into the Court due to non-following the directions of Authorities of the state where the project is situated, delay in handing over and inferior construction.

Demand Surveys 
AWHO conducts demand surveys to determine demand for a housing project at a certain location. Applicants are requested for Rs. 10,000/- to register into the demand survey scheme. There is no interest provided for this money. If an applicant wants to withdraw later, he gets the original amount minus 2%. Quite often demand surveys run for a long while without resulting in any actual housing project starting up. There are also several demand surveys which are discarded later citing lack of demand or inability to acquire land.

References

1978 establishments in India
Indian Army
Government agencies established in 1978
Organisations based in Delhi